Esporte Clube XV de Novembro may refer to:

Esporte Clube XV de Novembro (Piracicaba), a Brazilian football club from Piracicaba
Esporte Clube XV de Novembro (Jaú), a Brazilian football club from Jaú
Esporte Clube XV de Novembro (Caraguatatuba), a Brazilian football club from Caraguatatuba
Clube 15 de Novembro, a Brazilian football club from Campo Bom